Lake Victoria is an unincorporated community and census-designated place (CDP) in Clinton County in the U.S. state of Michigan.  It is located in Victor Township.  As of the 2010 census, it had a population of 930.

History
The community of Victoria Lake was listed as a newly-organized census-designated place for the 2010 census, meaning it now has officially defined boundaries and population statistics for the first time.

Geography

The Lake Victoria CDP consists of a residential development surrounding a lake of the same name in eastern Victor Township. The eastern edge of the CDP is the eastern border of the township (and county), with Sciota Township of Shiawassee County to the east.

Demographics

References 

Unincorporated communities in Clinton County, Michigan
Lansing–East Lansing metropolitan area
Unincorporated communities in Michigan
Census-designated places in Clinton County, Michigan
Census-designated places in Michigan